Observatoire Astronomique de Mont-Soleil is an astronomical observatory located on Mont-Soleil, above Saint-Imier in the Canton of Berne, Switzerland. It has a dome of 4.5m.

External links
www.pleiades.ch

References 

Mont-Soleil
Buildings and structures in the canton of Bern